Beccar  is a town located  north of the Buenos Aires metropolitan area in the Buenos Aires Province, Argentina. It is part of the partido of San Isidro in Gran Buenos Aires. It is situated close to the historic town of San Isidro and it is characterized by tree lined streets and plazas, red tiled roofed style chalets, high-rise apartment buildings that line the Avenida Centenario zone and by being close to the coast of Rio de la Plata river and yacht clubs. Nearby there is a large shanty town (Villa La Cava). Beccar is served by a 10-minute walk to scenic Tren de la Costa  light rail line at Punta Chica station and the commuter railway at Beccar station with easy access to Buenos Aires city centre and the weekend retreat of the Village of Tigre.

F.I.N.C.A. Béccar

In the town of Beccar, in the mid-1930s, a young German immigrant entrepreneur, Dr. Erich Zeyen, who together with an associate friend, Dr. Germán Wernicke, created a building firm, F.I.N.C.A. Sociedad Anónima Argentina de Ahorro (Joint Stock Company of Argentina). Soon the small company began to acquire importance and built their first planned community, F.I.N.C.A. Béccar within the town.

Notable residents
Adolfo Pérez Esquivel, architect and 1980 Nobel Peace Prize recipient
Jorge Guerrero Dantur, actor and singer
Victoria Ocampo, intellectual and writer, former owner of the Villa Ocampo residence
Tomás Martínez, football player for Houston Dynamo FC in the MLS.

Martina Stoessel

See also 

Ciudad Jardín Lomas del Palomar

References

External links 
 History of de Béccar
 Information about Béccar ~ San Isidro
 News site for San Isidro Partido

Populated places in Buenos Aires Province
San Isidro Partido
Planned communities
Cities in Argentina
Argentina